JW Bible College (JW) is a Bible college in Lighthouse Point, Florida, affiliated with the Assembly of God Bethlehem Ministry. The school was first founded in Lighthouse Point, Florida in 1998.

The school primarily offers instruction in theology. The Assembly of God Bethlehem Ministry, Florida - USA, with the support of Confradeb - Fraternal Convention of Ministers of the Assemblies of God of Brazil in the United States, constantly expanding, has seen the need to invest in knowledge and systematic theological knowledge. The JW Bible College is a non-profit corporation duly registered in the State of Florida in the United States.

References

External links

Bible colleges
Seminaries and theological colleges in Florida
Assemblies of God seminaries and theological colleges
Educational institutions established in 1998